Akkarai Vattam is a village in the Orathanadu taluk of Thanjavur district, Tamil Nadu, India.

Demographics 
At the 2001 census, Akkarai Vattam had a total population of 1,147 with 576 males and 571 females. The sex ratio was 991. The literacy rate was 45.44%.

References 

Villages in Thanjavur district